Caprarica di Lecce (Griko: , Krapàreka) is a town and comune in the Italian province of Lecce. It is located in the Apulia region of south-east Italy.

Antonio Verri (1949–1993) was a poet and writer who was born in the town.

References

Cities and towns in Apulia
Localities of Salento